Eduardo Cornejo was a Chilean boxer. He competed in the men's lightweight event at the 1948 Summer Olympics.

References

External links
 

Year of birth missing
Possibly living people
Chilean male boxers
Olympic boxers of Chile
Boxers at the 1948 Summer Olympics
Place of birth missing
Lightweight boxers